The Loay Interior Road is a , two lane national secondary road that connects the municipality of Loay to the municipality of Trinidad in Bohol, Philippines. This highway serves as one of the principal gateways to Carmen, which is known for being the main location and tourist spot of the Chocolate Hills. 

The entire highway is designated as National Route 852 (N852) of Philippine highway network.

History 
This road was designated as National Route 852 (N852) of the Philippine highway network by the Department of Public Works and Highways.

Route description 

The route starts in Loay, as a junction from Tagbilaran East Road. It traverses to Loboc, Bilar and Batuan. The road reaches Carmen and makes junctions of Carmen−Sagbayan−Bacani Road (N853) and Dat-an−Carmen−Sierra Bullones−Pilar−Alicia Road (N854), respectively. The highway traverses to Dagohoy and San Miguel. After reaching Trinidad, the road ends at a Three-way intersection of Tagbilaran North Road and Tagbilaran East Road.

Incidents 

 This highway was one of the roads in Bohol to suffer from the 2013 Bohol earthquake, specifically in the Loboc section. Tourist destinations were damaged along with the town's main church.
Typhoon Seniang damaged many lunch cruise boats.

References 

Roads in Bohol